The Front of Patriotic and National Parties – FPNP (Arabic: جبهة الأحزاب الوطنية والقومية | Jabhat al-Ahzab al-Wataniyya wal-Qawmiyya) or Front Patriotique des Parties Nacionaux (FPPN) in French, was a Syrian-backed coalition of Lebanese Political parties and militias formed in the late 1970s.

Origins
It was formed in late March 1976 at West Beirut by breakaway sections of the Lebanese National Movement (LNM), which included the pro-Syrian factions of the Syrian Social Nationalist Party in Lebanon (SSNP) and the Arab Socialist Ba'ath Party – Lebanon Region, the Shia Amal Movement led by Musa al-Sadr, Kamal Shatila's Union of Working People's Forces (UWPF) and the Kurdish Razkari Party. The FPNP supported the June 1976 Syrian intervention in Lebanon.

Decline and demise
The alliance lasted until mid-1982, when it collapsed together with their LNM rival in the wake of the Israeli invasion of Lebanon.

See also
 Lebanese Civil War
 Lebanese National Movement
 Lebanese National Salvation Front
 Jammoul

Notes

References

Edgar O'Ballance, Civil War in Lebanon, 1975-92, Palgrave Macmillan, London 1998. 
 Rex Brynen, Sanctuary and Survival: the PLO in Lebanon, Boulder: Westview Press, Oxford 1990.  – 
 Itamar Rabinovich, The war for Lebanon, 1970-1985, Cornell University Press, Ithaca and London 1989 (revised edition). , 0-8014-9313-7 – 
Lucien Bitterlin, La flamme et le soufre, VegaPress, 1988.  (in French) – 
 Naomi Joy Weinberger, Syrian Intervention in Lebanon: The 1975-76 Civil War, Oxford University Press, Oxford 1986. , 0195040104

External links
Chamussy (René) – Chronique d'une guerre: Le Liban 1975-1977 – éd. Desclée – 1978 (in French)

Arab militant groups
Defunct political party alliances in Lebanon
Factions in the Lebanese Civil War
Israeli–Lebanese conflict
Organizations associated with the Ba'ath Party